Riddiford Nunatak is a small but conspicuous nunatak (c.1200 m) with an adjoining lower outcrop, lying 2.5 nautical miles (4.6 km) west-northwest of Abercrombie Crests in Darley Hills, Churchill Mountains. Named by Advisory Committee on Antarctic Names (US-ACAN) after Charles E. Riddiford, National Geographic Magazine cartographer/typographer, about 1923–58; his drawings illustrate the NGM monograph The Round Earth on Flat Paper, 1947. One of several features in Darley Hills that are named for NGS staff.
 

Nunataks of Oates Land